Molybdopterin synthase sulfurtransferase (adenylyltransferase and sulfurtransferase MOCS3, Cnx5 (gene), molybdopterin synthase sulfurylase) is an enzyme with systematic name persulfurated L-cysteine desulfurase:(molybdopterin-synthase sulfur-carrier protein)-Gly-Gly sulfurtransferase. This enzyme catalyses the following chemical reaction

 [molybdopterin-synthase sulfur-carrier protein]-Gly-Gly-AMP + [cysteine desulfurase]-S-sulfanyl-L-cysteine  AMP + [molybdopterin-synthase sulfur-carrier protein]-Gly-NH-CH2-C(O)SH + cysteine desulfurase

The enzyme transfers sulfur to form a thiocarboxylate moiety on the C-terminal glycine of the small subunit of molybdopterin synthase.

References

External links 
 

EC 2.8.1